Allabands Mill Stream is a  long 1st order tributary to Isaac Branch in Kent County, Delaware.

History
Allabands Mill Stream was named for William Allaband, who operated a nearby grist mill called Allaband's Mill in the early 1800s.

Course
Allabands Mill Stream rises about 2 miles west-southwest of Alms House in Kent County, Delaware on the Willow Grove Prong divide.  Allabands Mill Stream then flows north to meet Isaac Branch about 0.5 miles east of Wild Quail, Delaware.

Watershed
Allabands Mill Stream drains  of area, receives about 44.8 in/year of precipitation, has a topographic wetness index of 615.36 and is about 2% forested.

See also
List of Delaware rivers

Maps

References

Rivers of Delaware
Rivers of Kent County, Delaware